Petrosains, also known as Petrosains, The Discovery Centre is a Malaysian science and technology museum located in the heart of Kuala Lumpur within Suria KLCC, Petronas Twin Towers. Petrosains was a brainchild of 4th Prime Minister Mahathir Mohamad and established on 25 March 1999. It is owned and operated by Petrosains Sdn. Bhd., a wholly owned subsidiary of the Malaysian oil and gas conglomerate Petronas. Tengku Nasariah Tengku Syed Ibrahim is the CEO of Petrosains until 2018. The current CEO is Ezarisma Azni Mohamad.

Petrosains also a principal organizer of the annual Petrosains Science Festival since its inauguration in 2013.

Gallery

See also
 Petronas
 Petronas Gallery

References

External links

 

Petronas
1999 establishments in Malaysia
Science museums
Petroleum museums
Museums in Kuala Lumpur